Damn the Machine is a studio album by American heavy metal band Damn the Machine, released on June 8, 1993, through A&M Records. It features former Megadeth guitarist Chris Poland, and remains the band's only release.

Critical reception 
In 2005, Damn the Machine was ranked number 64 in Rock Hard magazine's book The 500 Greatest Rock & Metal Albums of All Time.

Track listing

Personnel 
Damn the Machine
David Judson Clemmons – lead vocals, guitar, production
Chris Poland – guitar, background vocals, production
Mark Poland – drums, background vocals, production
Dave Randi – bass, background vocals, production

Technical personnel
Pat MacDougall – engineering
Brian Malouf – engineering, mixing, production
Howie Weinberg – mastering

References 

1993 debut albums
A&M Records albums